Wilson Rodrigues de Moura Júnior  (born 31 January 1984 in Santo André), known simply as Wilson, is a Brazilian footballer who plays as a goalkeeper.

Career

Early years 
After almost ten years in Flamengo's junior team, he began professional in 2005. Has short period in Portuguesa and Olaria, both in Rio de Janeiro, and came at Figueirense in 2007.

Figueirense 
He debut in Figueirense against Avaí, had won by 3–0. Due his great performances, he turn one of the recent idols of Figueirense's fans. He scored three goals. Wilson pass by good and bad moments in club, but always had support of fans, whom always believe in goalkeeper's potential, and saw the goalkeeper one of the main characters in return campaign of main league in 2011.

After a law problem with the club due three month of salary delay, Wilson canceled his contract with Figueirense in February 2013, his statistic are: 300 matches in club.

Vitória 
On 25 February 2013, Wilson was announced as new goalkeeper of Vitória. Initially, he was hired to be in second team, Wilson debut in draw against Salgueiro.

Although, the best chance of Wilson with Vitória's t-shirt came on May 18, one day before a match against Bahia, at final of Championship of State of Bahia, when the main goalkeeper, Deola, injured in training.

In Campeonato Brasileiro, Wilson was beyond. The goalkeeper was one of the main players of Vitória and championship.

Coritiba 
On 18 June 2015, Wilson was hired by Coritiba. He had many great moments with them and in April of 2021 he completed 250 games for Coritiba. He is considered an idol in the recent years by many Coritiba fans.

Honours
Figueirense
Campeonato Catarinense: 2008

Vitória
Campeonato Baiano: 2013

List of goals scored

Following, is the list with the goals scored by Wilson:

References

External links

1984 births
Living people
People from Santo André, São Paulo
Brazilian footballers
Association football goalkeepers
Campeonato Brasileiro Série A players
Campeonato Brasileiro Série B players
CR Flamengo footballers
Associação Atlética Portuguesa (RJ) players
Olaria Atlético Clube players
Figueirense FC players
Esporte Clube Vitória players
Coritiba Foot Ball Club players
Clube Atlético Mineiro players
Footballers from São Paulo (state)